Horace Charles Gorringe (4 July 1895 – 17 July 1994) was an Australian rules football player in Tasmania, who is considered to have been one of the greatest rovers in the game's history.

Family
The son of Lowther Gorringe (1864–1927), and Evelyn Sophia Gorringe (1868–1954), née Watson, Horace Charles Gorringe was born on 4 July 1895 at Sandford, Tasmania.

He married Myra Muriel Newnham (1899–1992) on 7 February 1929.

Football

Brighton Rovers
In 1912 and 1913 he was playing along with his brother, Eric Lowther John Gorringe (1893–1970), for the Brighton Rovers.

Cananore (TFL)
Gorringe played for the Cananore club in the Tasmanian Football League between the years 1914 and 1930.

He was Club Champion in 1928, winning the Most Consistent award.

He played numerous matches at representative level for both the league and the state—in a war interrupted career (no TFL competition in 1916, 1917, and 1918), he played in 157 club games for Cananore, and in 35 combined games, and represented Tasmania in the 1924 and 1927 carnivals—including the match in Adelaide, when the TFL representative team beat South Australia, in Adelaide, on 21 July 1923.
    "In his playing days Gorringe used to practise his celebrated stab kick by aiming at the open top half of a stable door at his farm at Tea Tree, a few miles from Hobart. He could do it nine times out of ten with either foot from 30 yards.
    "On Saturday [6 June 1925, when I was the central field umpire in the match in the match between Cananore and New Town] I saw [Gorringe] do what I've I've never seen another footballer do in my life, and that is to change his direction left and right practically in one stride. I've seen rovers who could swerve to the right, run a few strides, and then swerve to the left again, but very very few, yet Gorringe can left and then right turn with only one stride in between each action. It makes him extremely elusive. Ia addition to handling and kicking the ball like a champion, lie impressed me as being an ideal opponent." – eminent South Australia umpire, Charles Robert O'Connor (1873–1961).
    "Frank Maher, Essendon's skipper and first-class rover, considers that Horrie Gorringe, the Tasmanian, is the best rover seen in Melbourne for many a long day. "He is a beauty all right", said Maher. "Why. he is as slippery as an eel, a beautiful pass, and uncanny in his Judgment. On a running shot he is phenomenally accurate, while elsewhere his play stamps him as Australia's best rover. An amazing thing about Gorringe, however, is that on a deliberate shot he is not at all accurate." – The Sporting Globe, 7 September 1927.
    "Running Backward There Is another rather rare method of obtaining a clean breakaway It is to step backward. It is the last thing opponents expect you to do, and it is a very difficult feat to accomplish. But many of the finer points of football are difficult until you learn them. Alan la Fontaine, of Melbourne, is able to run backward comfortably and I once knew a player in Tasmania, named Horrie Gorringe, who could run backward out of a pack just as fast as he ran into it." – Ivor Warne-Smith, 1937.

Death
He died on 17 July 1994, aged 99.

Recognition

Horrie Gorringe Medal
The "Horrie Gorringe Medal" was between 2002 and 2005 a brief replacement of the William Leitch Medal for the best and fairest footballer in Tasmania.

Tasmanian Football Team of the Century
In 2004, he was selected as forward-pocket/rover in the Tasmanian Football Team of the Century.

Tasmanian Football Hall of Fame
In 2005, he was inducted, as one of the three inaugural "icons", into the Tasmanian Football Hall of Fame.

Australian Football Hall of Fame
Gorringe was inducted into the Australian Football Hall of Fame in 2011. He was the first and (as of 2014) only player who played his entire career in Tasmania to have been so inducted.

See also
 1927 Melbourne Carnival

Footnotes

References

 World War Two Nominal Roll: Horace Charles Gorringe (T26769), Department of Veterans' Affairs.
 Gorringe, H.C., "Unlimited Stamina is a Rover’s Chief Asset", The (Hobart) News, (Friday, 25 July 1924), p.5.
 Tasmania Prepares for the Carnival: Tasmanian Carnival Players: Two Hobart Stars, The Sporting Globe, (Wednesday, 30 July 1924), p.14.
 Sharland, "Jumbo, "Who is Australia's Best Footballer", The Sporting Globe, (Wednesday, 27 May 1925), p.6.
 Sharland, "Jumbo, "Victoria Admires Footballers from Other Parts of Australia: Horrie Gorringe: Tasmania's Rover", The Sporting Globe, (Saturday, 13 August 1927), p.6.
 Coventry, G., "Those Busy Rovers", The Sporting Globe, (Saturday, 21 May 1938), p.8.
 O'Neil, Pat (1938a), "Gorringe Finest Rover The Nationals (sic) Game Has Seen", The Sporting Globe, (Wednesday, 6 July 1938), p.9.
 O'Neil, Pat (1938b), "Only Training "Partner" Was A Barn Door", The Sporting Globe, (Wednesday, 13 July 1938), p.11.
 Blaze at Cygnet: Grower's Home Destroyed: Trophies Lost, The (Hobart) Mercury, (Monday, 19 February 1940), p.2.
 Gorringe Loses Home and Trophies, The Sporting Globe, (Wednesday, 21 February 1940), p.15.
 Horrie Gorringe's Tips to Young Rovers, The Weekly Times, (Wednesday, 10 June 1942), p.33.
 Dairyman Shows Value of Clover as Fodder Basis, The (Hobart) Mercury, (Wednesday, 8 October 1952), p.25.
 Alomes, Stephen,"Australian Football", The Companion to Tasmanian History, University of Tasmania, Centre for Tasmanian Historical Studies. 2008.

External links

 

1895 births
1994 deaths
Cananore Football Club players
Australian rules footballers from Tasmania
Australian Football Hall of Fame inductees
Tasmanian Football Hall of Fame inductees